There are about twenty different texts from Qumran which deal with a 364-day solar calendar. They are mainly very fragmentary, so the calendar is not completely understood. However, it is significantly different from the Babylonian lunar calendar which evolved into the 354-day Hebrew calendar as known today. The scrolls calendar divided the year into four quarters and recorded the feast days of the community. Feasts were fixed to the solar year and so occurred on different days from those indicated in the Babylonian-based calendar. Many of the texts are rosters of weekly shifts or courses of temple service for the twenty-four priestly families, known as Mishmarot.

Structure
The year is made up of twelve months, grouped in quarters. Each quarter contains three months; two of 30 days and one of 31 days, i.e. 91 days or 13 weeks, each quarter. The following table shows a quarter of the year. (The day names are provided only to facilitate understanding. Other than the weekly Sabbath, the other days were merely numbered in the calendrical texts.)

The year and each of its quarters starts on the same day, the fourth day of the week (Wednesday to us). This was the day when the sun was created in Genesis 1:14–18.

However, the calendar as we know it is 364 days long, making it one and a quarter days short of a true year. This means, if it were put into practice, it would quickly lose synchronisation with astronomical events. Because of this, Lawrence Schiffman has stated the view that "this calendar was never really put to the test except perhaps for a short period". Uwe Glessmer has proposed on the basis of 4Q319 ("Otot") that the calendar was in fact intercalated, a week being added every seven years to keep it synchronised with the solar year. Roger Beckwith suggested that the discrepancy between the calendar and the true year, though noticed, may not have been of concern to the community that used the calendar.

Mishmarot
The Mishmarot are texts which outline the weekly courses of the twenty-four priestly families who perform duties in the temple. The order of families follows that found in 1 Chronicles 24:7–18. Repeating the twenty-four over a period of six years completes a full cycle and the following year once again starts with the first of the priestly families.

Here are a few entries in 4Q325 ("Mishmarot D"):

The beginning of the se[cond] month is [on the si]xth [day] of the course of Jedaiah. On the second of the month is the Sabbath of the course of Harim....

As the years are traversed, Sabbaths and feast days are usually noted. For example (from 4Q326):

[.. on the evening of the fourteenth day of the month] is the Feast of Unleavened Bread. On the fou[rth day of the week is a holy assembly. On the twenty-fifth of the month is] a Sabbath. On the twenty-sixth of the month is the B[arley] Festival....

The texts are quite fragmentary, but because so much of the material is formulaic, restoration is relatively easy.

One of these texts, the extremely fragmentary Mishmarot C (4Q322–324b), also contains a number of historical allusions, mentioning the names "Yohanan" (perhaps John Hyrcanus) and Shelamzion (Salome Alexandra). Illusive snippets of text read "Shelamzion entered..." and "Hyrcanus rebelled..." (presumably Hyrcanus II who rebelled against his brother Aristobulus II). Another fragment twice mentions "Amelios killed..." Aemilius Scaurus (one of Pompey's lieutenants in Judea in 63 BCE).

Other texts
Among the calendrical works is 4Q317, which lists the phases of the moon with respect to the 364-day calendar, 4Q318 ("Brontologion"), which contains a section which used thunder at various times to predict the future, and 4Q319 (Otot or "signs"), which analyzes certain events over a period of 294 years, i.e. six Jubilees.

Footnotes

Bibliography
 Uwe Glessmer, "Investigation of the Otot Text (4Q319) and Questions about Methodology", in Methods of Investigation Wise et al., pp. 429–440.
 Uwe Glessmer, "Calendars in the Qumran Scrolls", in The Dead Sea scrolls after fifty years, Peter W. Flint and James C. Vanderkam. eds., Vol. 2 (Leiden: Brill, 1999)  pp. 213–278.
 Helen R. Jacobus. 'Zodiac Calendars in the Dead Sea Scrolls and Their Reception: Ancient astronomy and Astrology in Early Judaism.' Leiden: Brill, 2014.  
 Lawrence Schiffman, Reclaiming the Dead Sea Scrolls (Philadelphia: Jewish Publication Society, 1994) .
 Sacha Stern, "Qumran Calendars: Theory and Practice", in The Dead Sea Scrolls: In Their Historical Context, Timothy Lim ed. (Edinburgh: T & T Clark, 2000)  pp. 179–186.
 Shemaryahu Talmon, "Calendars and Mishmarot", in Encyclopedia of the Dead Sea Scrolls, Lawrence H. Schiffman & James C. VanderKam eds., Vol. 1 (Oxford, 2000)  pp. 108–117.
 James C. VanderKam, "Calendrical Texts and the Origins of the Dead Sea Scroll Community", in Methods of Investigation Wise et al., pp. 371–388.
 James C. VanderKam, Calendars in the Dead Sea Scrolls: Measuring Time (Routledge, 1998) .
 Michael O. Wise, "An Annalistic Calendar from Qumran", in Methods of Investigation Wise et al., pp. 389–408.
 Michael Wise, Martin Abegg Jr., & Edward Cook, The Dead Sea Scrolls: A New Translation (HarperSanFrancisco, 1996)  pp. 296–323.
 Michael O. Wise, Norman Golb, John J. Collins, and Dennis Pardee, Methods of Investigation of the Dead Sea Scrolls and the Khirbet Qumran Site (New York Academy of Sciences, 1994) .
 Geza Vermes, "The Complete Dead Sea Scrolls in English" (The Penguin Press, 1997) .

External links
 Calendric Signs (Otot) from 4Q319

Dead Sea Scrolls
Calendars
Hebrew calendar